El Boquerón National Park (Spanish: Parque Nacional El Boquerón, is located on top of the San Salvador Volcano at  the park's main attraction is a crater five kilometers in diameter and 558 meters deep. In addition, there is a small crater within the crater named “Boqueroncito” (little Boquerón). El Boquerón has a cool temperate climate year round.

The park is home to many plant species identified as ornamentals such as “cartuchos”, hydrangeas, begonias and wild “sultanas”. There is wildlife such as armadillos, raccoons, deer, foxes, among others.

The park features a visitors' centre and short hiking trails up the side and along the rim of the crater.

References

National parks of El Salvador